Toveh-ye Latif (also Romanized as Toveh-ye Laţīf, Tovah Latīf, Toveh-e Laţīf, and Toveh Laţīf; also known as Tua Latif) is a village in Mahidasht Rural District, Mahidasht District, Kermanshah County, Kermanshah Province, Iran. At the 2006 census, its population was 288, in 60 families.

References 

Populated places in Kermanshah County